Alfred Hollingsworth was an American actor during the silent film era. According to IMDb he also directed four short films in 1916. Hell's Hinges has been described as a classic and Hollingsworth earned plaudits for his role in it.

In 1908, he wrote Mills of the Gods, a five act drama. He also wrote a play called Crisis in 1919. In 1922, he copyrighted Prodigal Son, a travesty in three acts.

Filmography

As director
The Dreamer (1916)

As actor
Lady Godiva (1911)
Love's Bitter Strength (1916)
The Three Musketeers (1916)
Hell's Hinges (1916)
The Beggar of Cawnpore (1916)
Purity (1916)
The Sable Blessing (1916)
The Right Direction (1916)
The Gilded Youth (1917)
 The Girl and the Crisis (1917)
Polly Ann (1917)
Fair Enough (1918)
The Hawk's Trail (1919)
A Man's Country (1919)
The Uplifters (1919)
23 1/2 Hours' Leave (1919)
The Joyous Liar (1919)
Diane of the Green Van (1919)
As the Sun Went Down (1919)
 Leave It to Susan (1919)
White Youth (1920)
The Leopard Woman (1920)
The Infamous Miss Revell (1921)
Trimmed (1922)
The Egg (1922)
The Bearcat (1922)
The Phantom Fortune (1923)
 Marry in Haste (1924)

References

External links
 
 

Date of birth missing
Date of death missing
American male silent film actors
20th-century American male actors
American film directors
20th-century American dramatists and playwrights